is a Japanese manga series by Mamora Gōda. It won the 11th Grand Prize for manga at the Japan Media Arts Festival in 2007. It was adapted into a live-action television drama in 2010.

Synopsis
New prison guard Naoki Oikawa  gets assigned to the death row section. He strikes a friendship with Watase Mitsuru, who, rather conveniently (contrast with Freeze Me), far from being a sadist, a sociopathic killer or rapist, dangerous to society or even particularly cruel, is actually quite a sympathetic character, someone that, unable to get justice from the system, killed the man that murdered his parents. The fact that he did not target defenceless and innocent victims for no good reason, but rather had a motive that could be understood, allows the guard to put himself in his shoes and understand his reasons and point of view, and provides a contrast between the unfairness of his circumstances, his undeserved fate, and the fact that system had failed to vindicate his parents, leaving him with no other alternative besides being cast in the role of the powerless victim. Gradually Naoki begins to wonder about the necessity of the death penalty and the meanings of such concepts as repentance and forgiveness.

Television series

Cast
 Atsushi Itō – Naoki Oikawa (22)
 Arata – Mitsuru Watase (22)
 Yuu Kashii – Asami Sawasaki (Oikawa's girlfriend) (22)
 Haruka Kinami – Kana Mochizuki (19)
 Akira Emoto – Keizukuri Hukahori (59)
 Sansei Shiomi – Yuzo Wakaboyashi (62)
 Mitsuki Tanimura – Yoshioka Koharu
 Youichi Nukumizu – Toshikazu Seko
 Bengal – Toshiyuki Tanizaki
 Masahiro Toda – Kazuaki Satonaka
 Yasuyuki Maekawa – Ryo Goto
 Ren Oosugi – Seido Oikawa (Oikawa's father)
 Yoshie Ichige – Sawako Oikawa (Oikawa's mother)
 Akiko Aizuki – Takako Toma

Guest
 Shido Nakamura – Tadashishi Kouzai  (ep1)
 Naomasa Musaka – Akira Ishimine  (ep1)
 Koji Ohkura – Katsuhiro Hoshiyama (ep1-2)
 Yuri Nakamura – Taeko Kuramoti (ep2)
 Mitsuru Hirata – Takeshi Sasano (ep3)
 Mari Hamada – Victim's parents (ep3)
 Yumiko Shaku – Yuko Nishida  (ep4-5)
 Kanji Tsuda – Sako Nishi (ep4-5,7)
 Yuki Imai –  Shinya Hukuda  (ep4-5)
 Hiromasa Taguchi – Kengo Hukuda  (ep5)
 Ryo Ishibashi – Eichiro Akashi  (ep6)
 Minoru Tanaka – Takashi Touzyou  (ep6)
 Kotaro Shiga – Chief Justice  (ep6)
 Mashima Hidekazu – Kento Yamamoto  (ep7)
 Saki Matsuda – Miyoko Yoshikawa  (ep7)
 Yojin Hino – President of shipping company  (ep7)
 Rei Okamoto – Kazuko Funaki  (ep7)
 Mayuko Nishiyama –  (ep8)

Episode information

References

External links
 TV drama official website at TV Tokyo

2004 manga
2010 Japanese television series debuts
2010 Japanese television series endings
Futabasha manga
Japanese television dramas based on manga
Seinen manga
TV Tokyo original programming